was a Japanese freestyle swimmer.

He represented Japan at the 1952 Summer Olympics in Helsinki, Finland. There, he won a silver medal as a member of the 4 × 200 m freestyle relay team, alongside Toru Goto, Hiroshi Suzuki and Teijiro Tanikawa. Also competed in the 100m freestyle advancing to the semifinals, missing the finals by a narrow margin.

After retiring he debuted as an actor in the 1955 film Buruuba as a Japanese version of Tarzan. He also appeared in the TV Show Shōnen Jet, a detective adventure show made by Kadokawa Pictures.

References

 databaseOlympics
 

1926 births
Swimmers at the 1952 Summer Olympics
Olympic swimmers of Japan
Olympic silver medalists for Japan
2011 deaths
World record setters in swimming
Japanese male freestyle swimmers
Medalists at the 1952 Summer Olympics
Olympic silver medalists in swimming
People from Takamatsu, Kagawa
20th-century Japanese people